The 99th Infantry Battalion (separate) was a battalion of Norwegian-speaking soldiers in the US Army. Created in July 1942 at Camp Ripley, Minnesota, the battalion originally consisted of 1,001 soldiers. The battalion was attached to the First Army; however, it was labeled "Separate" because it was not attached to a specific regiment.

Background

After the attack on Pearl Harbor, the War Department considered how the military could use foreigners and bilingual, first-generation immigrants from German-occupied areas to assist the war effort. The initial assessment concluded that it would be "un-American" to train foreign troops on US soil, prompting the Norwegian government to refuse a request to recruit Norwegians in the United States for military training in Canada. After a time, however, the War Department decided to set up special units of US citizens from certain ethnic groups for operations in countries occupied by the Axis powers.

The following five battalions, established in 1942, were organized based on ethnic groups:

 1st Filipino Infantry Battalion: Filipino (the nucleus of later 1st and 2nd Filipino infantry regiments)
 99th Infantry Battalion (separate): Norwegian
 100th Infantry Battalion (separate): Japanese
 101st Infantry Battalion (separate): Austrian (dissolved in 1943 before active service)
 122nd Infantry Battalion (separate): Greek

A Polish unit was also proposed, but never created.

Personnel

In Norwegian historiography, the men of the 99th Infantry Battalion are often referred to as "Norwegian-Americans." This is only partially correct; the original intention was to transfer as many voluntary "Norwegian nationals" who had begun the immigration process (a condition of enlistment) to the unit from existing armies as could be acquired. In her book, The 99th Battalion, the Norwegian novelist Gerd Nyquist estimates that first-generation Norwegian immigrants may have constituted 50 percent of the original force – about 500 men. One of Nyquist's sources from the battalion said 40 percent of the battalion had been Norwegian citizens (around 400 soldiers). This figure was the result of an informal survey conducted by Nyquist; however, the survey was limited to 152 respondents. Based on information from a veteran of the battalion, Max Hermansen argues in his book D-dagen 1944 og norsk innsats that there were approximately 300 Norwegians in the battalion.

Training

In October, 1942, the battalion moved to Fort Snelling, Minnesota; and again in December, 1942, to Camp Hale in Colorado for training in winter warfare and alpine warfare. On September 5, 1943, the 99th Infantry Battalion was shipped out from New York to Scotland. In the UK, the battalion was stationed in Perham Down Camp in Wiltshire, between Salisbury and Andover. The training there was for infantry purposes as D-Day approached, and it became increasingly clear that the battalion would receive its baptism by fire in Operation Overlord.

OSS Norwegian Special Operations Group

During the stay at Camp Hale in 1943, the Office of Strategic Services (OSS) asked for volunteers from the battalion. The OSS selected 80 enlisted men and twelve officers for what would become OSS Norwegian Special Operations Group (NORSOG). OSS special operations groups were the Americans' counterpart to Britain's Special Operations Executive. NORSOG was initially intended for action in Norway, but, by 1944, the group was instead used in operations behind German lines in France. In early 1945, NORSOG operated in Norway where they performed railway sabotage until the liberation (Operation Lapwing, also known as Operation Grouse).

In combat

The 99th Infantry Battalion landed on Omaha Beach on the evening of June 22, 1944, and then took part in the final battle for Cherbourg. As a "separate" battalion, it belonged to no regiment, but was attached to different formations as needed. From September, the battalion operated in Belgium. During Christmas 1944, the battalion was involved in the Battle of the Bulge.

The battalion participated in the following campaigns:

 Normandy: June 22, 1944 – July 24, 1944
 Northern France: June 25, 1944 – September 14, 1944
 Rhineland (Würzlen–Aachen): September 15, 1944 – December 16, 1944
 Ardennes–Alsace: December 17, 1944 – January 18, 1945
 Central Europe: April 4, 1945 – May 11, 1945

The 99th Infantry Battalion spent 101 days in combat. The casualties suffered were 52 killed in combat, 207 wounded and six missing in action. These 207 men were wounded multiple times, several five times, thus the 207 received 305 Purple Hearts.  

The following individual decorations and medals were awarded to members of the 99th Infantry Battalion:

 15 Silver Stars
 20 Bronze Stars
 305 Purple Hearts
 763 Good Conduct Medals
 814 Combat Infantry badges

474th Regiment

On January 19, 1945, the 99th Infantry Battalion joined the 474th Infantry Regiment in Child-sur-Mer. The regiment was recently formed, partly to prepare for a possible invasion of Norway in the event of a partial German withdrawal from Norway. At this point, the German forces in Norway evacuated and burned Finnmark, and retreated behind the Lyngen Line. A scenario where the Germans had to retreat south of Dovre, making it possible to establish the Norwegian government in Trondheim, seemed likely.

On April 2, the regiment moved to Aachen, in Germany. The 99th Infantry Battalion's tasks consisted mainly of patrolling and the suppression of pockets of continued German resistance until May 11.

Between April 15–18, 1945, the 474th Infantry Regiment, including the 99th Infantry Battalion, was responsible for the transportation of Nazi treasures found the Merkers mine. The convoy, named "Task Force Hansen," transported 3,762 bags of currency, 8,307 gold bars, 3,326 bags of gold coins, and numerous bags of silver, platinum, jewelry and art treasures to a safe place in the Frankfurt area.

Post-War

The 99th Infantry Battalion was reactivated at Fort Rucker, Alabama on September 30, 1956, when the 351st Infantry Regiment was inactivated and the infantry force on post reduced to battalion strength. It remained active for only a short while, however, and on 24 March 1958 it was inactivated, with its personnel and equipment being reorganized as the 2d Battle Group, 31st Infantry when the Army adopted the Pentomic organizational concept. Like the 351st before it and the 31st that followed, the 99th was a unit organized for Aviation Center training support at Fort Rucker.

Literature
The unit is covered in various works, including:
 Gerd Nyquist: Bataljon 99 (1981) (Norwegian) / 99th Battalion (2014) (English)
 Howard R. Bergen: 99th Infantry Battalion US Army (1945).
 Sgt. John Kelly: Company 'D' United States Army (1945).
 Sharon Wells Wagner: Red Wells, An American Soldier in World War 2 (2006).
 Bruce H. Heimark: The OSS Norwegian Special Operations Group in World War II (1994).
 Knut Flovik Thoresen: Soldat på vestfronten, historien om Alf Dramstad (2010) (Norwegian).
 Robert A. Pisani: The Canal Drive, The 99th Infantry Battalion and the Liberation of Belgian Limburg, September 1944 (2012).
 Gerd Nyquist, 99th Battalion: The Long Way Home

References

Further reading

External links 
"Minnesota National Guard Unit Histories"
 Official 99th Website includes various pages with information about training, service in the United States and England, service on the European continent and in Norway, Operation Rype, post-1945, uniforms and insignia, a roll of honor, newsletters, and further resources

Infantry battalions of the United States Army
Military units and formations established in 1942